The Clearing House Payments Company L.L.C. (PayCo) is a U.S.-based limited liability company formed by Clearing House Association. PayCo is a private sector, payment system infrastructure that operates an electronic check clearing and settlement system (SVPCO), a clearing house, and a wholesale funds transfer system (CHIPS).

Governance
Clearing House Association and The Clearing House Payments Company LLC conduct business under the name The Clearing House. The Clearing House is the oldest banking association and payments company in the United States.

The Clearing House governance model includes a supervisory board and two managing boards, one for the Payments Company and one for the Association. The businesses and affairs of PayCo and the Association are managed by the Supervisory Board. The managing boards of PayCo and the Association have responsibility for the oversight of their respective businesses and financial performance and for the establishment of their agendas.

Member banks
 Banco Santander 
 Bank of America 
 The Bank of New York Mellon 
 MUFG Union Bank 
 BB&T 
 Capital One 
 Citibank 
 Comerica 
 Deutsche Bank 
 HSBC 
 JPMorgan Chase 
 KeyBank 
 PNC Financial Services 
 Citizens Financial Group
 Regions Financial Corporation
 UBS 
 U.S. Bancorp 
 Wells Fargo

Payments Company shared board seat
 City National 
 Fifth Third Bank 
 First Citizens 
 M&T

PayCo services

Clearing House Interbank Payments System
The Clearing House Interbank Payments System (CHIPS) is a bank owned automated funds-transfer system for domestic and international high value payment transactions in U.S. dollars. It is a real-time final settlement payment system that continuously matches, off-sets and settles payments among international and domestic banks.

CHIPS provides real-time, immediate and final settlement of payment messages continuously throughout the day similar to Fedwire. During the business day, system participants can send their payments to CHIPS. Funds are released by available funds on hand (no overdrafts are permitted) or through offsetting. A “balance release algorithm” continuously searches the queue of unreleased payments and uses this patented off-setting algorithm to match and release payments.

CHIPS’ ability to perform real-time bilateral and multi-lateral off-setting means that very large payments can be released earlier in the day, and that participants realize greater liquidity efficiency savings than those possible in pure RTGS systems. With real-time off-setting, the system continuously offsets payments between two or more CHIPS participants. A payment is considered final and irrevocable at the instant CHIPS releases it.

Since CHIPS’ inception The Clearing House management has implemented a number of credit, systemic and liquidity risk reduction measures to better manage individual participant risk, eliminate daylight overdraft exposure, and virtually eliminate systemic risk.

Electronic Payments Network
Electronic Payments Network (EPN) is an automated clearing house (ACH), i.e. a computerized, batch-processing funds-transfer system that processes domestic consumer and commercial financial transactions among depository institutions. Rather than sending each payment separately, ACH transactions are accumulated and sorted by destination for transmission during a predetermined time period.

The Automated Clearing Exchange System (ACES) is the core computerized system for EPN processing of payments between account holders at depository financial institutions. EPN serves approximately 450 processing customers. EPN participants include Depository Financial Institutions (DFI) throughout the United States and its territories as part of a nationwide network for domestic commercial banks, thrifts, credit unions and agencies of foreign institutions.

SVPCO
SVPCO is The Clearing House's line of business that operates CHECCS, which is a computerized settlement system.

SVPCO Online Adjustments provides a secure online database to automate cash letter adjustments.

SVPCO Online Settlement is integrated with the SVPCO Image Payments Network and provides automated settlement for cash letter activity. It also works in tandem with SVPCO Online Adjustments, which allows institutions to reconcile adjustments the same day by eliminating the need for paper forms and attachments.

Check exchanges
The New York Clearing House Association was organized at the Bank Officers meeting on October 4, 1853. There were fifty-seven banks in New York City in 1853. Fifty-two became members of the Association. The first check exchanges at The Clearing House were held on October 11, 1853. The Clearing House does not exchange physical checks any longer. The original check exchanges have evolved into a new computerized check settlement system operated by SVPCO called the Clearing House Electronic Check Clearing System (CHECCS).

References

Banking in the United States
Lobbying organizations in the United States